Galatasaray SK is a Turkish professional football club, found in 1905, based on the European side of the city of Istanbul in Turkey. The club is Turkey's far most successful football team in UEFA competitions. 

In 1905, the club had been found with the following mission:

Gala has first participated in a European competition in 1956, entering the European Cup, and have competed in forty eight seasons of European competitions since then. The club has achieved their most successful period in late 80s, the millennium year (2000) and beyond. They have won once both the UEFA Cup and the UEFA Super Cup title. Making them the first and only Turkish club to have won a European competition trophy. The successful millennium year resulted also in an invitation by FIFA to the FIFA Club World Cup, but the second edition of the tournament had been cancelled owing to a combination of factors such as the collapse of FIFA's marketing partner in same year. Despite having reached several times the quarter-finals and also once the semi-finals of the UEFA Champions League campaign, the club has not won the trophy so far.

Biggest achievements
UEFA Cup / UEFA Europa League
Winners (1): 1999–00

UEFA Super Cup
Winners (1): 2000

European Cup / UEFA Champions League
Semi-finalist (1): 1988–89

1999–2000 UEFA Cup

The 1999–2000 UEFA Cup competition was won by Galatasaray after they defeated Arsenal in the final. The victory marked the first time a Turkish side had won a European club football trophy, prompting wild celebrations on the streets of Istanbul.

Galatasaray entered the competition after finishing in third position in Group H after the first group stage of the 1999–2000 UEFA Champions League, resulting in their transfer to the UEFA Cup, ahead of fourth-placed Milan. Their final group stage victory, against Milan, began a series of victories against Bologna, Borussia Dortmund, Mallorca and Leeds United en route to the final, held at Parken Stadium in Copenhagen.

The final was scoreless through both the first 90 minutes and after extra time. After 94th minute Gala played remaining part of the extra time with 10 players; Gheorghe Hagi received a straight red card, after game footage showed the player holding and striking Tony Adams in the back; the Arsenal captain was awarded a yellow card for hitting Hagi during the altercation. In the ensuing penalty shoot-out, Patrick Vieira and Davor Šuker missed for Arsenal, while Galatasaray's Ergün Penbe, Hakan Şükür, Ümit Davala all converted past goalkeeper David Seaman. Gheorghe Popescu then scored the winning kick to win the UEFA Cup for Galatasaray.

Galatasaray had won an impressive treble that season, also winning the Süper Lig and the Turkish Cup.

2000 UEFA Super Cup

The 2000 UEFA Super Cup was a football match played on 25 August 2000 between Real Madrid of Spain and Galatasaray of Turkey. Real Madrid qualified by beating Valencia in the 2000 UEFA Champions League Final, while Galatasaray had made it to the Super Cup after beating Arsenal in the 2000 UEFA Cup Final. Galatasaray won the match 2–1, both goals scored by Brazilian international Mário Jardel, the latter a golden goal. The equalizer of Real Madrid was scored by a penalty goal by Spanish international Raúl Gonzalez.

1988–89 European Cup

The first-ever European success was during the 1988-89 season of the European Cup club competition. The club was coached by Mustafa Denizli. Galatasaray started in the first round and reached the semi-finals where they got eliminated by Romanian club Steaua București and future club legend Gheorghe Hagi. Throughout the competition Galatasaray has played against Rapid Wien, Neuchâtel Xamax, Monaco and Steaua București. The second round game against Neuchâtel Xamax was really incredible; Galatasaray lost the away game by 3-0. The return game was being played in front of 35000 fans at the Ali Sami Yen stadium and Galatasaray won the game by 5-0 and promoted to the quarter-finals by a 5-3 aggregation result.

Overall record

By competition

Legend: GF = Goals For. GA = Goals Against. GD = Goal Difference.

By country

Matches

UEFA club ranking

Current ranking

Ranking history

Record players

Key
UCL = UEFA Champions League, UEL = UEFA Europa League (including UEFA Cup), UCWC = UEFA Cup Winners' Cup, USC = UEFA Super Cup,

Most appearances

Top goalscorers
Numbers in brackets indicate appearances made. Ø = goals per game

References

External links
Official Galatasaray SK website  
Avrupa Kupalarında Galatasaray - GALATASARAY.ORG
Galatasaray _ History _ UEFA Champions League _ UEFA.com
Galatasaray _ History _ UEFA Europa League _ UEFA.com

Europe
Turkish football clubs in international competitions